Rahm may refer to:

Rahm (name), given name and surname, includes list of people with the name
Rahm (film), 2016 Pakistani film based on William Shakespeare's play Measure for Measure
Rahm, Indiana, U.S., an unincorporated community

See also
Rahim, one of the names of Allah in Islam